Sovereign Power (SV) is a populist political party in Latvia, founded on 4 July 2022 by Jūlija Stepaņenko and Ļubova Švecova.

Before Stepanenko led the party, it was legally registered on 24 January 2005 first as Latgale Heart Union and then as Law.Responsibility.Order.

The party had 3 seats in the 13th Saeima of Latvia: Jūlija Stepaņenko, Ļubova Švecova and Ainārs Vilciņš, officially sitting as independents. After taking part in the 2022 parliamentary election the party didn't win any seat, losing its parliamentary representation.

Election results

Legislative elections

References 

Political parties established in 2022
2022 establishments in Latvia
Conservative parties in Latvia
Russian political parties in Latvia